1 Field Ambulance is a medical unit with the Canadian Armed Forces situated in Edmonton, Alberta. 1 Field Ambulance sent a contingent to Kandahar Province in Afghanistan in the fall of 2009.

Notable members 
 Master Corporal Paul Franklin
 Corporal Andrew James Eykelenboom, killed in a suicide attack near Spin Boldak (August 11, 2006).
 Private Colin William Wilmot, killed when a bomb detonated while he was on a foot patrol in the early morning of July 6, 2008.

References

Medical units and formations of Canada